The 1932 Washington Huskies football team was an American football team that represented the University of Washington during the 1932 college football season. In its third season under head coach Jimmy Phelan, the team compiled a 6–2–2 record, finished in fourth place in the Pacific Coast Conference, and outscored all opponents by a combined total of 193 to 56. Bill O'Brien was the team captain.

Schedule

References

Washington
Washington Huskies football seasons
Washington Huskies football